Assassination Nation is a 2018 American satirical black comedy thriller film written and directed by Sam Levinson. It stars an ensemble cast led by Odessa Young, Suki Waterhouse, Hari Nef, and Abra. The film takes place in the fictional town of Salem, which devolves into chaos and violence after a computer hacker discovers and leaks personal secrets about many of its residents.

Development of the film began in October 2016, when it was announced as the independent label Foxtail Entertainment's first project. Casting announcements were made throughout 2017 and principal photography commenced in March 2017 and took place in New Orleans. Months later, Neon acquired the film rights with the Russo Brothers's AGBO.

The film had its world premiere at the Sundance Film Festival on January 21, 2018 and was theatrically released in the United States on September 21, 2018, by Neon and AGBO in association with Refinery29. It has grossed $2.8 million worldwide and received mixed reviews from critics, who praised its "frenetic and visually stylish" action but criticized what were called thinly written characters.

Plot
In the town of Salem, high school senior Lily Colson regularly hangs out with her three best friends, Bex Warren and sisters Em and Sarah Lacey. They go to a party where Bex hooks up with her crush Diamond, while Lily hangs out with her boyfriend Mark, simultaneously texting a man only known as Daddy behind his back. After having sex, Diamond tells Bex to keep their hookup a secret, as Bex is transgender.

Marty, a casual hacker, receives a message from an unknown hacker about Mayor Bartlett, a known anti-gay candidate. He reveals pictures of Bartlett engaging with male escorts and dressing up in women's clothing, which Marty forwards to the entire town. During the press conference in which he is supposed to address the facts, Bartlett publicly commits suicide. Salem High's kindhearted Principal Turrell is the next to be hacked, with pictures of his 6-year-old daughter in the bath making people view him as a pedophile. During a meeting with angry parents, he refuses to resign, intending to set things right for the students and do what is best for the school itself.

As the police question Marty about the hacks, a massive data dump of half the people in Salem is posted. Lily's classmate Grace discovers that her best friend Reagan has sent Grace's nude pictures to her boyfriends and they are now public; Grace strikes Reagan with a baseball bat during her cheerleading practice, rendering her comatose. Daddy is revealed to be Em and Sarah's neighbor Nick Mathers, who Lily used to babysit for. The lewd pictures and videos that Lily sent to Nick are made public when his information is leaked. As a result, she is exposed and humiliated by Mark, forcing her parents to disown her from their family. As she walks down her street, shunned, homeless, and miserable, she is harassed by a man in a truck who films and harasses her before chasing her with a knife. Eventually, she stuns him with a shovel before going into hiding in Em and Sarah's house.

A week later, most of the town has donned masks and taken up arms to get revenge on those they think have wronged them. Nick, now leading a mob of vigilantes in masks, capture Marty, whom they torture into admitting that Lily's IP address seemed to be the source of the hacks. Before executing Marty, they upload a video of his forced confession. The masked assailants track Lily to Em and Sarah's house, where all four girls are staying, and break in. Their mother, Nance, attempts to keep the marauders at bay, but she sadly sacrifices herself for Lily and Bex to escape the raid. Meanwhile, led by Officer Richter, the mob drags Em and Sarah outside and puts them into a police car. Bex takes out one of the attackers with a nail gun and makes her way out onto the streets to find help, while Lily hides in Nick's house.

Nick at first pretends to help Lily before brandishing a knife, intending to rape her to death for exposing the townspeople’s secrets and causing the disintegration of his marriage and family. She manages to incapacitate him and hides in the bathroom, where she discovers Marty’s corpse. Nick manages to get inside, but after a brief struggle, Lily finally puts him down with a razor blade. She discovers his large cache of weapons, which she uses to gun Richter down and rescue Sarah and Em from his custody. Meanwhile, Bex is captured by Diamond's best friend, Johnny, who tries to force Diamond to hang her as retribution for his humiliation. Bex convinces him to spare her, so Johnny has him tied up. Lily, Em, and Sarah rescue Bex, eliminating all of Johnny’s friends in the process. Johnny surrenders and begs for his life; Bex spares him and frees Diamond. Lily makes a video proclaiming her innocence and urging everyone in Salem to stand up and fight back against their tormentors; she is soon joined by a crowd of victims who are suspected by the mob for wronging them with the hacks.

After the riot, Lily's younger brother Donny, the mastermind behind the hacks, is captured and charged for cyberterrorism, murder, and invasion of privacy. When he asked why he did it by his parents, Donny reveals that he did it all for his amusement. The Salem High marching band performs Miley Cyrus' "We Can't Stop" through the destroyed town littered with dead bodies and destroyed vehicles.

Cast

Production

Development

In October 2016, Matthew Malek and Anita Gou launched the independent label Foxtail Entertainment. The duo announced the film as their first project. David S. Goyer and Kevin Turen joined them to produce the film. It is also produced by Bron Studios and Phantom Four, in association with Creative Wealth Media.

After the premiere at Sundance Film Festival, Neon acquired the film rights. AGBO signed a deal with 30West, a company who acquired a majority stake in Neon, to co-distribute the film with Neon. In July 2018, Refinery29 also signed with Neon to co-distribute the film with them and AGBO.

Casting
In December 2016, Odessa Young, Suki Waterhouse, Hari Nef and Abra joined the main cast of the film.

In March 2017, Bella Thorne, Maude Apatow, Bill Skarsgård, Joel McHale, Colman Domingo and Noah Galvin joined the cast. In April 2017, Anika Noni Rose joined the cast for the role of Nance, an attractive woman with terrible taste in men, who has an unfortunate reputation in the conservative town of Salem.

Filming
Principal photography began in March 2017 in New Orleans. The sequence where the girls are attacked in Nance's home was shot in a single take using a crane.

Music
The film's score was written by Ian Hultquist, who stated that Levinson gave him "a completely blank slate" to work with, doing experimentations in "slowing down, and degrading audio but still somehow keeping it musical" and at a certain point composing an entire soundtrack written in the style of Ennio Morricone's Spaghetti Western work. Along with Morricone, Hultquist singled out influence from Marco Beltrami's soundtrack for Scream and Cliff Martinez’s "dark synth stuff", as well as taking inspiration from pop songs by AIR, Kanye West, Lana Del Rey and Migos. A particular turning point for composition was when Levinson received from his friend Isabella Summers, who Hultquist also met as their bands Florence and the Machine and Passion Pit toured together, the song "Rage", which ended up in the soundtrack.

Release

Theatrical
The film had its world premiere at the Sundance Film Festival on January 21, 2018. It was released in the United States on September 21, 2018 by Neon and AGBO in association with Refinery29.

Home media
Assassination Nation was released digitally and on Blu-ray and DVD on December 18, 2018 by Universal Pictures Home Entertainment.

Reception

Box office
, Assassination Nation has grossed $2 million in the United States and $847,617 in other territories, for a worldwide total of $2.9 million.

In the United States, Assassination Nation was released alongside The House with a Clock in Its Walls, Life Itself and Fahrenheit 11/9 and did poorly in theaters. The film was projected to gross around $4 million in its opening weekend from 1,403 theaters. However it ended up debuting to just $1 million, finishing 15th at the box office. Internationally, the film was released in only five countries as a limited theatrical release.

Neon's chief Tom Quinn acknowledged the film's unsatisfactory box office performance, saying "Sam Levinson has created a bold, visionary and ultimately cathartic response to the dumpster fire that is 2018. We're admittedly disappointed more people didn't come out this weekend, but those that did were loud and overwhelmingly positive. It's going to take more time for Assassination Nation to find its audience". Prior to the film release, analyst Jeff Bock compared the film to Heathers, saying "There's people out there who like these Heathers-type of films, but they tend to be more popular on home entertainment platforms" and "They're more likely to be cult favorites than big box office hits".

Critical response
The website's critical consensus reads, "Assassination Nation juggles exploitation and socially aware elements with mixed results, but genre fans may find it too stylish and viscerally energetic to ignore."

On Metacritic, the film has a weighted average score of 56 out of 100, based on 28 critics, indicating "mixed or average reviews". Audiences polled by PostTrak gave the film a 60% positive score and a 39% "definite recommend".

Accolades

References

External links
 
 
 
 
 

2018 films
2018 black comedy films
2018 crime thriller films
2018 independent films
2018 LGBT-related films
2010s comedy thriller films
2010s coming-of-age comedy films
2010s crime comedy films
2010s feminist films
2010s high school films
2010s satirical films
2010s teen comedy films
American black comedy films
American comedy thriller films
American coming-of-age comedy films
American crime comedy films
American crime thriller films
American feminist films
American films about revenge
American high school films
American independent films
American satirical films
American teen comedy films
American teen LGBT-related films
Battle royale
Bron Studios films
Films about bullying
Films about murderers
Films about school violence
Films about the Internet
Films about social media
Films about trans women
Films directed by Sam Levinson
Films produced by David S. Goyer
Films set in the United States
Films shot in New Orleans
Girls with guns films
LGBT-related black comedy films
LGBT-related comedy thriller films
LGBT-related satirical films
Teen crime films
Teen thriller films
Teensploitation
2010s English-language films
2010s American films